This is a list of the first minority male lawyer(s) and judge(s) in Kentucky. It includes the year in which the men were admitted to practice law (in parentheses). Also included are men who achieved other distinctions such becoming the first in their state to graduate from law school or become a political figure.

Firsts in Kentucky's history

Lawyer 

 First African American male: Nathaniel Harper (1871)

State judges 

 First African American male: Nathaniel Harper (1871) in 1888  
 First African American male (circuit court): Benjamin Shobe in 1976 
 First African American male (Kentucky Supreme Court): William E. McAnulty Jr.in 2006  
 First blind male: David Holton in 2008 
 First Latino American male: Daniel "Danny" Alvarez in 2018  
 First openly gay male (family court): Bryan Gatewood in 2017

Federal judges 
First South Asian American male (U.S. District Court for the Eastern District of Kentucky): Amul Thapar (1994) in 2007

Attorney General of Kentucky 

 First African American male: Daniel Cameron in 2019

Assistant Attorney General 

 First African American male: Darryl T. Owens

United States Attorney 

 First African American male: Steven S. Reed in 1999

Assistant United States Attorney 

 First African American male (Eastern District of Kentucky): Jesse Crenshaw in 1978

Kentucky Bar Association 

 First Jewish American male president: Fred Stepner around 1999

Faculty 

 First African American male law school dean: David A. Brennen in 2009

Firsts in local history 
 James Chiles (1890): First African American male lawyer in Lexington, Fayette County, Kentucky
 Gary D. Payne: First African American male judge in Fayette County, Kentucky (1988)
 Benjamin Shobe: First African American male appointed as a Judge of the Circuit Court in Jefferson County, Kentucky (1976)
 Eric Haner: First openly gay male judge in Jefferson County, Kentucky (2014)
 Bryan Gatewood: First openly gay male to serve as a Judge of the Jefferson Family Court (2017)

See also 

 List of first minority male lawyers and judges in the United States

Other topics of interest 

 List of first women lawyers and judges in the United States
 List of first women lawyers and judge in Kentucky

References 

 
Minority, Kentucky, first
Minority, Kentucky, first
Legal history of Kentucky
Kentucky lawyers
Lists of people from Kentucky